La vida inútil de Pito Pérez is a novel by Mexican author José Rubén Romero following the picaresque genre.  This work was first published in 1938. 

The protagonist Jesús "Pito Pérez" travels the world then returns to his hometown Santa Clara del Cobre and recounts his adventures.

A film by the same name was made in 1943 by filmmaker Miguel Contreras Torres.

References
Gastón Lafarga, La evolución literaria de Rubén Romero. México, Estudios Ibero-americanos, 1939.
Ernest R. Moore, Novelistas de la Revolución mexicana: José Rubén Romero. Habana, Colección "el ciervo herido", 1940.

1938 novels
Mexican novels